Denmark was represented by Hot Eyes (the name chosen for use at Eurovision by Kirsten & Søren), with the song "Det' lige det", at the 1984 Eurovision Song Contest, which took place on 5 May in Luxembourg City. "Det' lige det" was chosen as the Danish entry at the Dansk Melodi Grand Prix on 18 February. This was the first of three Eurovision appearances in five years for the couple.

Before Eurovision

Dansk Melodi Grand Prix 1984 
The Dansk Melodi Grand Prix 1984 was held at the DR TV studios in Copenhagen, hosted by Jørgen Mylius. Ten songs took part with the winner being decided by voting from five regional juries. The voting was close, with "Det' lige det" winning by only a 1-point margin. Other participants included familiar DMGP and Eurovision face Tommy Seebach and Lise Haavik (Trax) who would represent Denmark in 1986.

At Eurovision 
On the night of the final Hot Eyes performed 10th in the running order, following Ireland and preceding the Netherlands. "Det' lige det" was an instant and catchy pop song well-performed, and at the close of voting had received 101 points, placing Denmark 4th of the 19 entries, the country's first top 5 placing since their return to Eurovision in 1978. "Det' lige det" became only the fourth non-winning Eurovision song to receive points from every other national jury (following France in 1976 and 1978, and Belgium in 1982). The Danish jury awarded its 12 points to contest winners Sweden.

Voting

References 

1984
Countries in the Eurovision Song Contest 1984
Eurovision